Roflurane (INN, USAN, code name DA-893) is a halocarbon drug which was investigated as an inhalational anesthetic but was never marketed.

See also
 Aliflurane
 Halopropane
 Norflurane
 Synthane
 Teflurane

References

General anesthetics
Ethers
Organobromides
Organofluorides
GABAA receptor positive allosteric modulators
Fluranes
Abandoned drugs